Sveinung Fjeldstad (born 26 August 1978) is a retired Norwegian football striker.

Sveinung was the first player in the Norwegian top division to fail a drug test, he tested positive for steroids during training on 21 April 2004. He was released from his contract with HamKam and was suspended in 2004 and 2005.

References

External links

Gjøvik-Lyn
Kanaripedia

1978 births
Living people
Norwegian footballers
Odds BK players
Hamarkameratene players
Lillestrøm SK players
Sportspeople from Gjøvik
Doping cases in association football
Norwegian sportspeople in doping cases

Association football forwards
SK Gjøvik-Lyn players